Too Beautiful for You is a 1989 French romantic comedy-drama film written and directed by Bertrand Blier. It tells the story of Bernard (Gérard Depardieu), a well-established BMW car dealer in the South of France, who is cheating on his beautiful wife (Carole Bouquet) with his ordinary-looking secretary (Josiane Balasko).

Premise
Bernard Barthélémy, owner of a BMW car dealership, is married to an exceptionally beautiful woman, Florence, but he falls in love with a plain-looking but warm-hearted woman, Colette, who has been hired as a temp secretary at his dealership. This relationship will change his life. The film features surreal, fantasy sequences and a non-linear timeline.

Cast

Reception
The film had 2,031,131 admissions in France.

Accolades
 1989 Prix spécial du jury at the Cannes Film Festival
 1990 received five César Awards :
 César Award for Best Film
 César Award for Best Writing
 César Award for Best Director
 César Award for Best Actress (Carole Bouquet)
 César Award for Best Editing

References

External links
 
 
 
 

1989 films
1989 comedy-drama films
1989 romantic comedy films
1989 romantic drama films
Adultery in films
Best Film César Award winners
Films directed by Bertrand Blier
Films featuring a Best Actress César Award-winning performance
Films whose director won the Best Director César Award
1980s French-language films
French romantic comedy-drama films
1980s romantic comedy-drama films
Cannes Grand Prix winners
1980s French films